Eneko Romo Arangoa (born 19 January 1979) is a Spanish retired footballer who played as a midfielder.

Club career
Born in Pamplona, Navarre, Romo began his development at CD Pamplona and played his first years of senior football with the reserve teams of Athletic Bilbao and Deportivo Alavés in Segunda División B. In 2002–03, he was loaned to another club from the Basque Country, SD Eibar, and helped them stay in Segunda División on the last day of the season.

In January 2005, having not broken into an Alavés side that wanted to get rid of him, Romo left for Rayo Vallecano and later represented UE Lleida before making his way back to third-tier Eibar in 2006. He was their top scorer in his only season, with nine goals over the regular campaign and one more in a playoff victory over Rayo.

Romo spent most of the remaining decade of his career with Real Unión, with only the 2009–10 season above the third division; he totalled 263 games for the team from Irun. On 11 November 2008, away to Real Madrid in the last 32 of the Copa del Rey, he score a last-minute header against Jerzy Dudek to level the tie 6–6 on aggregate as his side advanced on the away goals rule.

On 24 March 2019, sporting director Romo was caretaker manager of Real Unión for a goalless draw at Racing de Santander, after the dismissal of Juan Domínguez.

Honours
Basconia
Tercera División: 1997–98

Eibar
Segunda División B: 2006–07

Real Unión
Segunda División B: 2008–09

References

External links

1979 births
Living people
Spanish footballers
Footballers from Pamplona
Association football midfielders
Segunda División players
Segunda División B players
Tercera División players
CD Basconia footballers
Bilbao Athletic footballers
Athletic Bilbao footballers
Deportivo Alavés B players
Deportivo Alavés players
SD Eibar footballers
Rayo Vallecano players
UE Lleida players
Real Unión footballers
Peña Sport FC footballers
Spanish football managers
Segunda División B managers
Real Unión managers